Mabinul Haq is an Indian writer from West Bengal who won the Sahitya Akademi Translation Prize in 2018.

Biography
Though Haq was born and raised in Purulia. He lives in Murshidabad. He translates books into Bangla. He translated Saadat Hasan Manto's works into Bangla titled Thanda Gosto O Anyanyo Galpo and Atish Pare. He also translated Ismat Chughtai's writings into Bangla titled Lep O Anyanyo Galpo and Sajjad Zaheer's writings into  Bangla titled Angaaray. Besides, he translated Urdu short stories of Pakistan into Bangla titled Pakistaner Urdu Golpo.

Publications
 Thanda Gosto O Anyanyo Galpo
  Atish Pare
 Lep O Anyanyo Galpo
 Angaaray
 Pakistaner Urdu Golpo

Awards and recognition
Haq translated Ismat Chughtai's Lihaaf and other Stories from Urdu into Bangla titled Lep O Anyanyo Galpo. For this work he was awarded  Sahitya Akademi Award for Bangla Translation in 2018.

References

Recipients of the Sahitya Akademi Award in Bengali
Living people
Indian translators
21st-century Indian translators
People from Murshidabad district
People from Purulia district
Year of birth missing (living people)
Recipients of the Sahitya Akademi Prize for Translation
Indian male writers
Indian writers
21st-century Indian male writers
21st-century Indian writers
Writers from West Bengal